Dryopteris clintoniana, commonly known as Clinton's wood fern, is a fern of hybrid origin native to the northern hemisphere.  It is a fertile hexaploid, arising as a species by doubling of its chromosome number from a hybrid between Dryopteris cristata, a tetraploid, and Dryopteris goldieana, a diploid.  It is more northern in its range than either parent species.

This fern will be found in wet areas, similar to the habitat of D. cristata.

References
 U.S. Department of Agriculture. 2009.

Line notes

clintoniana
Plants described in 1867
Flora of North America
Flora of Asia
Flora of Europe